GWG is a three letter acronym that can stand for:

 Girls with guns
 Game-winning goal, in sports
 Global warming gases (greenhouse gases)
Geometry Wars: Galaxies, a 2007 shoot 'em up video game

Organizations
 Goodwill Games (Olympic style games started during the Cold War)
 The former Garden Writers' Guild (renamed the Garden Media Guild in late 2007), a British trade association for garden writers, photographers and broadcasters
 Great Western Garment Co.
 Gas Working Group, from the CEER